The Secaucus Public Schools is a public school district that serves students in pre-kindergarten through twelfth grade from Secaucus, in Hudson County, New Jersey, United States.

As of the 2020–21 school year, the district, comprised of four schools, had an enrollment of 2,229 students and 187.5 classroom teachers (on an FTE basis), for a student–teacher ratio of 11.9:1.

The district is classified by the New Jersey Department of Education as being in District Factor Group "DE", the fifth-highest of eight groupings. District Factor Groups organize districts statewide to allow comparison by common socioeconomic characteristics of the local districts. From lowest socioeconomic status to highest, the categories are A, B, CD, DE, FG, GH, I and J.

Schools 
Schools in the district (with 2020–21 enrollment data from the National Center for Education Statistics) are:
Preschool
Millridge School / Early Learning Center serving PreK
Robert Valente, Principal
Elementary schools
Clarendon Elementary School with 470 students in grades K-5
Danielle Garzon, Principal
Huber Street Elementary School with 635 students in grades PreK-5
Robert Valente, Principal
Middle school
Secaucus Middle School with 514 students in grades 6-8
Christine Candela, Principal
High school
Secaucus High School with 594 students in grades 9-12
Steven Viggiani, Principal

Administration
Core members of the district's administration are:
Dr. Daniela Riser, Acting Superintendent & Director of Curriculum and Instruction
Grace Yeo, Business Administrator / Board Secretary

Board of education
The district's board of education, comprised of nine members, sets policy and oversees the fiscal and educational operation of the district through its administration. As a Type II school district, the board's trustees are elected directly by voters to serve three-year terms of office on a staggered basis, with three seats up for election each year held (since 2015) as part of the November general election. The board appoints a superintendent to oversee the district's day-to-day operations and a business administrator to supervise the business aspects of the district.

References

External links 
Secaucus Public Schools

School Data for the Secaucus Public Schools, National Center for Education Statistics

Secaucus, New Jersey
New Jersey District Factor Group DE
School districts in Hudson County, New Jersey